Lieutenant-Colonel David W. Baine (August 29, 1829 – June 30, 1862) was an American lawyer and Confederate veteran. He was a lawyer in Hayneville, Alabama, and an advocate of secession. He was the namesake of Baine County, Alabama, now known as Etowah County, Alabama.

Early life
David W. Baine was born on August 29, 1829 in Connecticut. His father, John McBain, was a Scottish immigrant from Dunfermline and a Methodist preacher. His mother, Maria Adkins, descended from an old Puritan family.

Baine graduated from Allegheny College at the age of 17.

Career
Baine began his career as a schoolteacher in Centre, Alabama in 1848. By 1855, he became a lawyer thanks to the influence of Thomas B. Cooper. A year later, he moved to Hayneville, Alabama. He quickly became the commanding officer (“general”) of a local band of militia, the Hayneville Guards. He also shared an office with William L. Yancey in Montgomery, Alabama. He was a delegate from Lowndes County, Alabama at the 1860 Democration National Convention, where he supported the secession of Alabama from the Union.

During the American Civil War of 1861-1865, Baine joined the Confederate States Army by enlisting in the 1st Regiment Alabama. On August 1, 1861, he became a Lieutenant Colonel in the 14th Regiment Alabama. He was first stationed in Camp Jones, Huntsville, Alabama, and he was transferred to Richmond, Virginia on November 4, 1861. He took part in the Seven Days Battles of June–July 1862, where he commanded the 14th Regiment Alabama alongside General James Longstreet's 5th brigade. His last military action was at the Battle of Frazier's Farm.

Personal life and death
Baine married Mary Powell Hogue, a Southern belle. They had two daughters, Mary (born 1850) and Mildred (born 1855), and a son, Thomas Cooper (born 1860). They resided on Washington Street in Hayneville, Alabama.

Baine was killed in battle on June 30, 1862. In 1866-1867, Etowah County, Alabama was called Baine County in his honor.

References

1829 births
1862 deaths
American people of Scottish descent
People from Connecticut
People from Lowndes County, Alabama
Allegheny College alumni
Alabama lawyers
Confederate States Army officers
Northern-born Confederates
19th-century American lawyers
Confederate States of America military personnel killed in the American Civil War